The Brisbane and District Women's Rugby League is one of the main Women's rugby league competitions in Australia.

History
The Brisbane and District Women's Rugby League started in 2004

Brisbane and District Women's Rugby League Clubs
Beerwah Women's Rugby League Club
Browns Plains Bears Women's Rugby League Club
Burleigh Bears
Burpengary Women's Rugby League Club
Cannon Hill Stars Women's Rugby League Club
Carina Tigers Women's Rugby League Club
Northern Suburbs Women's Rugby League Club
Normanby Rugby League Football Club
Pine Rivers Women's Rugby League Club
Southern Suburbs Women's Rugby League Club
Sunshine Coast Sirens
Springfield Panthers Women's Rugby League Club
Souths Logan Women's Rugby League Club
Swifts RLFC
Toowoomba Fillies
Waterford RLFC
Wests Inala FC 
Wynnum Manly Women's Rugby League Club

Former clubs

Premiers

Division 1
The following list is incomplete.

In 2020 the QRL Women's Premiership was launched, a state-wide competition which included the leading Brisbane and South East Queensland clubs. This new competition's 2020 season was suspended after one playing round and subsequently cancelled due to the COVID-19 pandemic in Australia. A restructure resulted in two competitions being played. The five-team Holcim Cup  included Burleigh Bears, Souths Logan Magpies,  Easts Tigers, Tweed Seagulls and Wests Panthers. The three-team South East Queensland Women's Premiership included Carina, Pine Central Hornets and Runaway Bay Seagulls.

Competing Teams 
In 1999 five teams competed: Brothers Ipswich, Goodna Eagles, Norths and Souths Magpies. 
In 2002 five teams competed: Aspley, Brothers Ipswich, Goodna Eagles, Sunshine Coast Crushers and Toowoomba Fillies. 
In 2003 fice teams competed: Brothers Ipswich, Goodna Eagles, Kedron Wavell Wildcats, Sunshine Coast Crushers and Toowoomba Fillies.
In 2004 five teams competed: Brothers Ipswich, Caboolture, Kedron, Toowoomba Fillies and Tugun. 
In 2005 four teams competed: Brothers Ipswich, Caboolture, Wests Centenary and Wests Mitchelton. 
In 2009 six teams competed: Souths Logan, Wests Centenary, Sunshine Coast Sirens, Caboolture, Runaway Bay and Logan Brothers. 
In 2013 ten teams competed in two divisions. Division 1: Souths Logan, Burleigh Heads, Beerwah, Wests Inana and Logan Brothers. Division 2: Aspley, Carina, Deception Bay Bombers, Wynnum-Manly Juniors and Swifts. 
In 2014 fourteen teams competed in two divisions. Division 1: Souths Logan, Beerwah, Burleigh Heads, North Ipswich, Carina, Aspley. Division 2: Burpengary, Waterford, Toowoomba Fillies, Swifts, Wests Inala, Pine Rivers, Wynnum Manly Juniors, Capalaba.

Division 2
The following list is incomplete.

See also

Rugby league in Queensland
Queensland Women's Rugby League
New South Wales Women's Rugby League
Western Australian Women's Rugby League

References

External links

Women's rugby league competitions in Australia
Rugby league competitions in Queensland
Rugby league in Brisbane
Sports leagues established in 2004
2004 establishments in Australia